Hastigerinella is a marine, unicellular genus of foraminiferan.

References

Globigerinina